Henrich Herman Mejer Foss (17 September 1790 – 21 September 1853) was a Norwegian military officer and elected official.

Biography
He was born in Bergen, Norway. He was the son of Jacob Finne Foss (1763-1822) and Margrethe Meyer (born 1763). He completed  artillery exams in Copenhagen during 1811.
He participated in the Gunboat War as artillery officer.  In 1830 he became the military officer of charge in Christiania (now Oslo). In 1843 he became major and later colonel lieutenant and battalion chief. He eventually rose to lieutenant colonel in the Norwegian Army, a rank he acquired in 1843. 

Foss was elected to the Norwegian Parliament in 1827 from the constituency Bergen, in 1830 from Moss, and from Christiania in 1833, 1836, 1839, 1842 and 1845. Foss was a member of the Norwegian-Swedish Union Committee (1841-44). He was a minister of government in the Ministry of Marine Affairs   (1845-48)
 He was mayor of Christiania in 1838, 1840 and 1841.

Foss authored several publications, including Bergens Beskrivelse in 1824 (with Lyder Sagen), publications on politics as well as songs. Some of the songs were intended to celebrate the Norwegian Constitution Day, of which Foss was a proponent. He also proposed a Norwegian civil ensign during the personal union with Sweden.

Streets have been named after him in Bergen  and Kongsberg as well as  Herman Foss' gate in  the  district  of St. Hanshaugen in Oslo.

References

1790 births
1853 deaths
Military personnel from Bergen
Norwegian Army personnel
Norwegian military personnel of the Napoleonic Wars
Members of the Storting
Mayors of Oslo
Government ministers of Norway
Order of the Dannebrog
Recipients of the St. Olav's Medal
Politicians from Bergen